Merošina is a village and municipality located in the Nišava District of the southern Serbia. According to 2011 census, the municipality has 13,968 inhabitants, from which 905 live in Merošina itself.

Geography
The municipality borders Aleksinac municipality in the north, City of Niš in the east, Doljevac and Žitorađa municipalities in the south, and Prokuplje municipality in the west.

Demographics

According to the 2011 census results, the municipality of Merošina has 13,968 inhabitants.

Ethnic groups
The ethnic composition of the municipality is:

Economy
The following table gives a preview of total number of employed people per their core activity (as of 2017):

See also
 Nišava District
 Subdivisions of Serbia

References

External links

 

Populated places in Nišava District
Municipalities and cities of Southern and Eastern Serbia